Hageman  may refer to:
 Hageman (surname)
 Hageman factor, another name for coagulation factor XII

Places
 Hagemans Crossing, Ohio, an unincorporated place in Ohio, United States
 Hageman Farm,  a historic house in New Jersey, United States
 Hageman Peak

See also
 Hagemann